Steve Gerlach (born 6 September 1971) is an Australian thriller writer. He currently lives in Melbourne, Victoria.

His works include numerous short stories and almost ten novels - eight of which have been published, or are soon to be published, in the United States.

Bibliography 
The Nocturne (1999): Probable Cause Productions. Limited paperback edition. 
(June 2009): Cargo Cult Press. Published as a 26-copy leather-bound hardcover and 150-copy limited hardcover.
Love Lies Dying (2002): Probable Cause Productions. Limited paperback edition. 
(December 2006): Bloodletting Press. Published as a 26-copy leather-bound hardcover and 300-copy limited hardcover. 
Rage (2003): Wild Roses Productions.
(January 2004): Bloodletting Press. Published as a 26-copy leather-bound hardcover and 300-copy limited hardcover. 
(2004): Leisure Books. Published as a mass market paperback. 
Cell Candy (January 2004): Bloodletting Press. Published as a 300-copy limited softcover.
Hunting Zoe (2004): Wild Roses Productions. Limited hardcover.
(March 2008): Bloodletting Press. Published as a 26-copy leather-bound hardcover and 300-copy limited hardcover. 
Lake Mountain (August 2005): Bloodletting Press. Published as a 26-copy leather-bound hardcover and 400-copy limited hardcover. 
A Killer Stalks the Outback (2005) ASIN B000BQ2IG2
Cloning Around (2005) ASIN B000BQ2IFS
Amber Rising (March 2009): Cargo Cult Press. Published as a 135-copy limited softcover.
Injustice (March 2009): Cargo Cult Press. Published as a 26-copy leather-bound hardcover and 150-copy limited hardcover.
 (Written in 1991. Unpublished until 2009.)
Harmony Chokes (unreleased)
A Thousand Mettle Folds - Cut I: The Fall 
 Within His Reach - Tasmaniac Publications
 Autopsy I, II and III - Three part series published through Legumeman Books in Australia.

Other work 
Steve Gerlach was the editor of In Laymon's Terms

Steve Gerlach was the historical advisor to the Australian film Let's Get Skase.

References

External links
Steve Gerlach on Australian artist website Arts Connect
 http://www.stevegerlach.com The official Steve Gerlach website
  Steve Gerlach Amazon.com page

1971 births
Living people
Australian thriller writers
Writers from Melbourne